Gyeon Ae-bok, often referred as Lady Gyeon in some historical sources, was the daughter of Gyeon Hwon and wife of Bak Yeong-gyu. These couple had a good-relationship with Wang Geon since Wang regard Bak as his older brother. Due to this, their oldest daughter became one of Wang's wife and the other daughters became Wang's third son's wives. These daughters were later known posthumously as Lady Dongsanwon, Queen Mungong, and Queen Munseong.

Family
Father: Gyeon Hwon (견훤; 867–936)
Grandfather: Ajagae (아자개)
Grandmother: Lady Sangwon (상원부인)
Mother: Lady Gobi of the Suncheon Bak clan (고비녀 순천 박씨)
Older brother: Gyeon Neung-ye (견능예)
Husband: Bak Yeong-gyu (박영규)
Mr. Bak (박씨) – 1st son.
Mr. Bak (박씨) – 2nd son.
Lady Dongsanwon (동산원부인) – 1st daughter.
Queen Mungong (문공왕후) – 2nd daughter.
Queen Munseong (문성왕후) – 3rd daughter.

In popular culture
Portrayed by Im Kyung-ok in the 2000-2002 KBS1 TV series Taejo Wang Geon.

References

Gyeon Ae-bok on Doosan Encyclopedia .

Year of birth unknown
Year of death unknown
Date of birth unknown
Date of death unknown
Silla people
People related with Late Three Kingdoms
Baekje people
Korean princesses